Pierrepont-sur-l'Arentèle is a commune in the Vosges department in Grand Est in northeastern France.

Inhabitants are called Pierrepontais in French.

Geography
The village is positioned on a minor road in the wooded countryside between Épinal and Saint-Dié.   As the name indicates, the commune is crossed by the river , which rises at the foot of the Avison Massif in the commune of Bruyères, some  through the forest to the southeast.

History
In the 7th century C.E., Saint Dié turned up on the banks of the Arentèle and started to build a monastery.   The territory was already inhabited, however; the villagers greeted the new arrivals with hostility, chasing them away in an easterly direction towards present-day Saint-Dié-des-Vosges, where the itinerant saint and his retinue founded that town.

See also
Communes of the Vosges department

References

Communes of Vosges (department)